Dream Maker is a Filipino-South Korean reality competition show. 62 Dream Chasers, aged 13–22 years old, competed to debut in a 7-member P-pop boy group, who will be trained in South Korea.

Contestants
The ages are as of the first episode aired on November 19, 2022.
Color key

Dream Mentors' Evaluation (Episodes 1-4) 

Dream Chasers will perform individually in front of the Dream Mentors. After each performance, the Dream Mentors will comment and provide feedback on each performance and each Dream Mentor will give points to each of the Dream Chasers. The maximum points possible for a Dream Chaser to earn from each Dream Mentor is 100, for a maximum possible score of 900 points for each contestant. This point system will form the basis of their ranks. If the succeeding Dream Chaser gets a higher rank than the Dream Chaser sitting, he will be bumping off other Dream Chasers based on the order of rank.

Color key

Group Battle Performances (Episodes 6-8) 

Different from the Produce 101 series, the Dream Mentors chose ten trainees whom they think has a leader material. The Dream Mentors chose Wilson Budoy, Vinci Malizon, Jeromy Batac, Drei Amahan, Tatin Castillon, Reyster Yton, KL Socobos, Laurence Matias, Matt Cruz, and Russu Laurente to be the leaders of their respective team. Wilson, as the highest-ranking leader, chooses his team members first, onw at a time. The process of choosing was based on their ranking from the 1st Mentors' evaluation. 

Each member can receive a maximum of 800 points from the 8 Mentors. 

All members of the winning team will receive a benefit of 100 points, which will be added up to their Mentors' Points. 

Color key

Position Mission (Episodes 13-16) 
Each Dream Chasers will choose their own position (Vocals, Dance, Rap). Each member can receive a maximum of 700 points from the 7 Mentors.

The one with the highest score from the mentors from each group will receive a benefit of 50 points. Aside from that, the Best Vocals, Best Dancer, and Best Rapper (the highest-scoring Dream Chaser from each position) chosen by the Dream Mentors will receive a benefit of 50 points.

Color key

New K-pop Song Launch Mission (Episodes 19-20) 

For this mission, there will be four original songs, all of which composed by Dream Mentor BULL$EYE. There will be two winning teams for this mission, and each of them will perform their song in one or two Kapamilya shows (It's Showtime and Magandang Buhay).

Aside from that, the Dream Chaser who got the most votes from the voting booth in the last mall show in Robinsons Las Piñas will get an additional benefit of 30 points to be used in the third elimination. On the mall show (televised on Episode 22), it was announced that Ishiro Incapas will receive the benefit after garnering 23.22% of the votes.

Color key

Final Mission (Episodes 25-26) 

In the final mission, there will be two songs to be performed: Dash, composed by Dream Mentor BULL$EYE, and Deja Vu, composed by Dream Mentor Seo Won-jin. Dream Chasers are given the chance to pick the song they want to perform. The order of choosing is based on the 3rd elimination ranking. After picking, the groups need to be balanced at 8 members each, and the group with the most members will need to vote secretly via the voting booth and the most voted Dream Chaser(s) will need to pick from another team.

In another twist, the order of the performance is determined by picking a paper in the bowl. Whoever gets the red paper will decide who will perform first. Matt Cruz gets the red paper, and his group decided to perform last.

Color key

Notes 

  *Anjo Sarnate joined in first season of Tawag ng Tanghalan, but he lost. He returned in the second quarter of the fifth season, but was eliminated in the face-off round to Aeron Santos. He also joined in third season of I Can See Your Voice as one of the mystery singers.
  Asi Gatdula was a contestant on the first season of The Voice Teens as a member of Kamp Kawayan. He lost the battle, but was stolen by Sharon Cuneta. He was later eliminated in the knockouts to Jeremy Glinoga.
  Chie Tan is a supporter of former Philippine President Rodrigo Duterte, who admitted to using his presidential powers in the shutdown of ABS-CBN and denial of franchise renewal. He also recently competed in Sing Galing!
  Denrich Ang joined Tawag ng Tanghalan on It's Showtime. He also joined the second season of The Clash and was eliminated in the One-on-One round.
  Drei Amahan used to be one of the back-up dancers of Dream Mentor Darren Espanto, as well as other P-pop artists BINI, BGYO, and AC Bonifacio. He also joined World of Dance Philippines, Your Moment, and Popinoy.
  Jay Lagatao competed in the show Your Moment as part of the group Acous3x and was eliminated in the first round.  
  Josh Labing-isa was a contestant on the second season of The Voice Teens as a member of FamiLea. He was eliminated in the knockouts to Cydel Gabutero, who ended up as one of the grand winners of the season. He also joined the fifth season of Tawag ng Tanghalan and was eliminated in the Quarterfinals to Reiven Umali, who ended up as the winner of the season.
  Josh Worsley was one of the first batch of teen housemates in Pinoy Big Brother: Otso. He was the first housemate evicted on Day 9.
  Joshua Nubla was a contestant of the second season of The Voice Teens as a member of Team apl. He was eliminated in the battle rounds to Tyson Venegas. 
  Kenzo Bautista, Kim Ng, Matt Cruz, Tanner Evans, and Tatin Castillon joined Top Class. Tanner was eliminated on Episode 4; Kim and Matt were eliminated on Episode 6; Kenzo and Tatin were eliminated on Episode 8. Tatin Castillon also joined Tawag ng Tanghalan on It's Showtime.
  Marcus Cabais, Omar Uddin, and Prince Encelan were previously former hosts of the children's television show Team Yey!. Marcus was on the third season, Omar was on the fourth and fifth season, and Prince was on the fifth season. Marcus also joined It's Showtime segment Mini Me and also appeared in the 2018 film My 2 Mommies. Prince also joined the fourth season of The Voice Kids and was eliminated in the blind auditions.
  Miguel Gonzales was a contestant on Pinoy Boyband Superstar under the screen name Cyrill Tumamak and was eliminated in the Middle Rounds' Last Chance Performance Night. He also joined in the first quarter of the fifth season, but was lost to Mark Anthony Mendoza. 
  Russu Laurente was a controversial housemate in Pinoy Big Brother: Connect. He was the second housemate to be evicted on Day 29.
  Wilson Budoy was a contestant on the fourth season of The Voice Kids Germany as a member of Mark Forster's team and was eliminated in the battle rounds.
  Some of the Dream Chasers' points were not revealed in the show.
  Although Chie and Lem got more public votes than Prince, the broadcast public points of the two Dream Chasers are 340, 350, and 360 points, respectively. 
  Although Winston got more public votes than Jay and Drei, the broadcast public points of these Dream Chasers are 690, 710, and 700 points, respectively.
  Although Reyster got more public votes than Ishiro, the broadcast public points of the two Dream Chasers are 760 and 770 points, respectively. However, it didn't affect the Dream Chasers' ranking.
  Although Jules got more public votes than Josh Labing-isa, the broadcast public points of the two Dream Chasers are 550 and 560 points, respectively. However, it didn't affect the Dream Chasers' ranking.
  Although Wilson got more public votes than Joshua, the broadcast public points of these Dream Chasers are 610 and 620 points, respectively.
  Although Kean got more public votes than Pan-pan and Kerwin, the broadcast public points of these Dream Chasers are 480, 500, and 490 points, respectively.
 JL and Redd's points were not revealed during the show, but their mentors' points are derived by subtracting their respective team score and the scores of their teammates.
  Because of the different number of members in each group, the winning team is based on the average of the score received by the members from the Dream Mentors.
  Although Tatin left before the 1st elimination and his score wasn’t broadcast, his score is derived by subtracting his team score from his members’ individual scores.
  Ishiro was given additional 30 points after receiving the most votes in the voting booth which happened in Robinsons Las Piñas mall show.
  Matt and Prince originally chose Deja Vu, but was voted out by their fellow members to go to Dash.

References

Dream Maker contestants
Dream Maker contestants
Dream Maker contestants
Dream Maker contestants